Gabriele Perretta (born 14 January 2000) is an Italian professional footballer who plays as a midfielder for  club Pontedera.

Career
Born in Pontedera, Perretta started his career in Empoli  youth sector.

On 19 July 2019, he was loaned to Serie C club Arzignano. He made his professional debut on 25 August against Piacenza.

On 10 August 2020, Perretta left Empoli and signed with Pontedera. On 6 November 2021, he scored a goal in Tuscany derby to Grosseto.

References

External links
 
 

2000 births
Living people
People from Pontedera
Sportspeople from the Province of Pisa
Italian footballers
Association football midfielders
Serie C players
Empoli F.C. players
F.C. Arzignano Valchiampo players
U.S. Città di Pontedera players
Footballers from Tuscany